Zvi Fuchs (12 April 1917 – 10 March 1999) was an Israeli footballer who played as a midfielder.

Early life 
Fuchs was born in Poland on 12 April 1917, and immigrated with his family to Mandatory Palestine in 1920.

Club career 
In the 1935–36 season, Fuchs made his senior debut for Maccabi Tel Aviv aged 19. On 5 March 1938, Fuchs scored his first goal in the Palestine Cup, in the quarterfinals against Maccabi Nes Tziona, helping his side win 3–1.

International career 
Fuchs represented Mandatory Palestine at international level in their last international match against Lebanon in 1940; it was his only international cap.

References

External links

 Zvi Fuchs at maccabipedia.co.il
 

1917 births
1999 deaths
Israeli footballers
Polish emigrants to Mandatory Palestine
Jewish Polish sportspeople
Jewish Israeli sportspeople
Maccabi Tel Aviv F.C. players
Beitar Tel Aviv F.C. players
Association football midfielders
Mandatory Palestine footballers
Mandatory Palestine international footballers